Kamenica is a village situated in Niš municipality in Serbia. It was the site of the Battle of Čegar (1809).

Gallery

References

Populated places in Nišava District
Niš